Retopology (or retopo) is a step in the 3D modeling process where an object's polygonal mesh is modified or recreated to obtain a cleaner layout while maintaining nearly the same physical shape of the model. Owing to its complexity, retopology is currently a mostly manual process but tools exist to assist 3D artists with the workflow. Automated and semi-automated retopology algorithms are an active field of research; state-of-the-art techniques provide good results in some, but not all, cases. Most organically-shaped models, especially those that are animated or used in real-time applications, must be created with clean topology to render and perform with good results.

References

3D computer graphics